Sport-Club Paderborn 07 e.V., commonly known as simply SC Paderborn 07 or SC Paderborn, is a German association football club based in Paderborn, North Rhine-Westphalia. The club has enjoyed its greatest successes since the turn of the millennium, becoming a fixture in the 2. Bundesliga before finally earning promotion to the Bundesliga in the 2013–14 season. They suffered a hasty fall from grace, however, being relegated to the 2. Bundesliga after only a season in the top division, and then again to the 3. Liga the season after. The club returned to 2. Bundesliga, reaching 2nd place in the 2018–19 season and was promoted to the Bundesliga. The club finished 18th in the 2019–20 season and returned to the 2. Bundesliga.

History

Fusion into SC Paderborn
For most of the twentieth century, Paderborn had two football clubs: TuS Schloss Neuhaus and FC Paderborn, who remained rivals until the 1980s. After Neuhaus had been promoted to the 2. Bundesliga and finished last in 1983, this set-up had reached its athletic and financial ceiling. Thus, in 1985, the two clubs merged into TuS Paderborn/Neuhaus. In 1997, the club adopted its current identity by assuming the name SC Paderborn 07, named after TuS Neuhaus' founding date 1907.

Beginnings in amateur football (1985–2005)
During most of the 1980s, the recently merged club competed in the third-tier Oberliga Westfalen, where they counted among the leading teams but never achieved promotion. In 1994, Paderborn won the league and thereby qualified for the promotion playoffs. The team lost to Eintracht Braunschweig and Fortuna Düsseldorf but secured a place in the newly formed third-tier of the German football pyramid, the Regionalliga West/Südwest. Except for a brief stint in the fourth tier, Paderborn enjoyed moderate success with regular trips to the DFB Pokal.

During one of these, in 2004/5, the club reached the round of 16 beating MSV Duisburg and Bundesliga side Hamburger SV on the way. It later emerged that latter match had been affected by match fixing; referee Robert Hoyzer had received a bribe to let Paderborn win the game. The incident remains the most significant betting scandal in the history of German football.

Consolidation in the 2. Bundesliga (2005–15)
Paderborn returned to the 2. Bundesliga for the first time in nearly thirty years at the end of the same season. The team's advance into professional football brought with it a professionalisation of its structures and in 2005 construction began on a new 15,000-seat stadium which replaced the dated Hermann-Löns-Stadion. All of this helped to establish the club as a regular component of Germany's professional football landscape. This process culminated in the club's first promotion to the Bundesliga after the 2013/14 season under coach André Breitenreiter, who had only joined the club from TSV Havelse at the start of the season.

Bundesliga and years of turbulence (2015–present)
Having never been in the Bundesliga before, Paderborn were described as "the biggest outsider in Bundesliga history" going into the season. The team started well; in the fourth game of the campaign against Hannover 96, midfielder Moritz Stoppelkamp scored a volley from 83 metres out, a Bundesliga record for the furthest ever goal. This goal also put the team top of the Bundesliga table at the time.

Paderborn were 10th in the table at the halfway point, but suffered a number of heavy losses in the second half of the season. On the second last matchday of the season, they dropped to last place, and were relegated on the final day. Upon relegation, a number of key players such as Alban Meha, Mario Vrančić, Lukas Rupp, Marvin Ducksch and captain Uwe Hünemeier left the club, while coach Breitenreiter joinedSchalke.

Starting the 2015/16 season with Markus Gellhaus in charge, Paderborn surprisingly gave former Germany international Stefan Effenberg his first coaching job in October 2015. In March, Effenberg was sacked, with the team bottom of the table and heading for a second consecutive relegation, which was later confirmed.  Now competing in the 3. Liga for the first time since 2009, Paderborn again found themselves at the bottom of the table. After Steffen Baumgart took over as coach in April, the team picked up 11 points from his five games in charge, but could not escape the relegation zone, finishing 18th. That should have been a third relegation in a row, this time to the non-professional Regionalliga West, but Paderborn were unexpectedly saved by 1860 Munich not receiving a license to play in the 3. Liga. 1860 were forced to move to the Regionalliga Bayern, which allowed Paderborn to stay in the third tier. 

Having been saved narrowly, Baumgart's team surprisingly finished second in the 2017/18 season and returned to the 2. Bundesliga. In 2019, a remarkable turn of events, the newly promoted side managed another top-two finish, which returned Paderborn to the Bundesliga after years of turbulence. The 2019/20 season, however, ended in the same way their first Bundesliga campaign did as Paderborn finished last, meaning relegation back to the second tier in June 2020. The following season, Paderborn finished 9th in the 2. Bundesliga, the first time since 2012/13 that the club finished outside the promotion or relegation places.

Recent seasons

Players

Current squad

Out on loan

Coaching & Medical Staff

Coaches
 Günther Rybarczyk (1993–2001)
 Uwe Erkenbrecher (2001–2003)
 Pavel Dochev (2003–2005)
 Jos Luhukay (2005–2006)
 Holger Fach (2007–2008)
 Pavel Dochev (2008–2009)
 André Schubert (2009–2011)
 Roger Schmidt (2011–2012)
 Stephan Schmidt (2012–2013)
 André Breitenreiter (2013–2015)
 Stefan Effenberg (2015–2016)
 René Müller (2016)
 Florian Fulland (2016) (interim)
 Stefan Emmerling (2016–2017)
 Steffen Baumgart (2017–2021)
 Lukas Kwasniok (2021–)

References

External links

 

 
Football clubs in Germany
Football clubs in North Rhine-Westphalia
Paderborn
1907 establishments in Germany
Association football clubs established in 1907
Bundesliga clubs
2. Bundesliga clubs
3. Liga clubs